Leebron is a surname. Notable people with the surname include:

David Leebron (born 1955), American attorney and legal scholar
Fred G. Leebron, American short story writer and novelist

See also
Lebrón